Tulsi Comics was an Indian comics publisher in the late 1980s, 1990s and early 2000s, and was a division of Tulsi Pocket Books - founded by Indian writer and author Ved Prakash Sharma.

History 
Backed by Tulsi Pocket Books, a popular publishers of Hindi novels in India, and backed by an established and vast customer base of the novels, Tulsi comics shut down in 2004, but after creating some of India's most famous and cherished superheroes.

Another reason for Tulsi Comics failure was that they produced story arcs in a minimum of 2–3 parts, and they never usually gave a complete story in a single issue. Since most of the comic readers in India are children who had limited pocket money, this practice ultimately backfired, and it lost popularity among its reader base. Chief among these was a huge story arc of Jambu spanning several comics lasting for more than a year.

Though this whole series was among the best Tulsi has ever offered creatively, this long continuing series, along with introducing a lot of new characters like Yosho who was blessing of God sun  (formerly advertised as Osho), Yoga, Baaz and Mr. India led to its death. The new characters were just not as exciting and older characters were multi-part stories.

Tulsi comics character "Jambu" was their most successful character, created by a Ved Prakash Sharma, followed by Angara and Tausi.

Frequency 
Tulsi Comics were published monthly. The number of comics published every month varied from 6 to 10 (sometimes 1 or 2 digest are also published as special issues.)

Angara, Tausi and Jambu were the three main heroes of this publication.

Some of the famous comics are Jambu aur Angara ka Yudh, Jambu aur Tausi, Mar Gaya Jambu, and Jambu ke Bete.

Head Office 
The Head Office of the Tulsi Pocket Books is -
Tulsi Pocket Books
Delhi Road
Meerut - 250 002
Contact Number - +91-999-7023-070

Characters 

 Angara – a super-intelligent being created from a gorilla, a fox, an elephant, a rhino, a vulture and a lion
 Tausi – a shape-shifting snake. He is the king of Naaglok (land of snakes which reside in human form) which is in Patal lok which is said to be below our earth. He time to time visits the current earth also.
 Jambu – a super genius robot, fitted with the brain of its creator scientist Dr. Bhawa. He was the most popular superhero of Tulsi Comics.
 Yosho – A fiery superhero, who comes to earth in search of his father.
 Yoga – A common man who through his Yogic powers becomes a superhero.
 Baaz – a common man who looks identical to prince of ghosts(prets) and gets the prince's costume to have super powers which helps him in fighting crime.
 Mr India – a superhero having support of spirits of 5 scientists who act as his super powers. 
 Shalu-Kalu – a funny boy girl pair. This is the only series in Tulsi Comics which is humour based.
 Detective Bharat – a detective who solves cases along with his friend Magician Goglapasha. In his very first comics, he saves Magician Goglapasha.
 Mahabali Aakash/Major Rajesh – a masked crime fighter.
 Other than the regular characters - Tulsi Comics published comics based on Kings-Queens, Princes-Princesses, Demons-Dragons-Ghosts and moral values. They also published some Bollywood Film stories in form of comics. Due to the lack of original characters, more than half of the total comics published by the company fall in this broad category.

Angara 

Angara, a man made of animal body parts, was created by Dr Kunal. Angara's rhino skin made him bullet-proof, and his brain from the fox gave him extraordinary intelligence, eyes was made up of vulture's eyes, he has the power taken from elephant, heart of the lion, and body of gorilla which made him look like a human. He has special commando training taken from experts and he knows the language of every animal. Dr Kunal helped him to achieve all these qualities which makes him a Super hero.

He was born to save animals and became known as a saviour of wild life. He was a Prime Minister of Angara land (or Angara Dweep). When Angara land was under the control of the American army, animal life was almost finished. The Americans wanted to plant an army base in Angara land but Dr Kunal, a great lover and a saviour of animals, tried to reason with the Americans to no avail. The US army killed almost all the wild life in Angara land. Dr Kunal, who was also a surgeon, decided to create a powerful creature to fight the Americans' powerful army and that's how Angara was born.

Members of the Angara land ministry include:
 Angad (chimp) - as President
 Sujuki - the Army Chief or Senapati
 Chilli - Defence Minister
 Jamwant (bear) - Law Minister
 Sher Singh (lion) - Home Minister
 Gajraj (elephant) - Food Minister
 Kastoori Hirini (deer) - Finance Minister
 Khargoshi (rabbit) - Education Minister
 Jatayu 
 Whale Rani
 Abu - the Spy
 Banu
 Seekhu Tota (parrot)
List of Angara Comics in chronological order (from beginning to latest)
 Angara
 Angara ki Jung
 Angara ka Atank
 Azadi ki Jung
 Angara hi Angara
 Angara ke Puzari
 Angara ki Takkar
 Angara Khatre me
 Mahakaal Angara
 Operation Angara
 Angara aur Kaala Danav
 Angara aur Khooni Bheriya
 Angara aur Kala Parvat
 Champion Angara
 Angara ka Bhookamp
 Khooni Darinda
 Angara aur Kohre ka Pret
 Mahayoddha Angara
 Angara aur Sheeba ki Jung
 Angara ka Mahasangram
 Angara Gayab
 Angara antriksh me
 Angara ki wapsi
 Angara aur Balara ki Rajkumari

 Angara aur Bulldog
 Great Angara
 Angara ka Janamdin
 Angara aur SinghRaj
 Angara Bauno ke Desh me
 Angara aur Hawa ka Beta
 Angara aur Commando Dragon
 Angara aur Bhooto ka Raja
 Angara aur Boksa ki Takkar
 Angara aur Charlie Ka Bhoot
 Angara ke 2 Dushman
 Angara Tilism me
 Double Angara
 Jai Bolo Angara Ki
 Angaara Tibet Mein
 Angara aur Raat Ka Baadshah
 Angara aur Charlie Ka Chacha
 Angara aur Panchmukhi
 Angara aur Chilli ki Agnipariksha
 Angara Jangara
 Angara aur TimTim
 Angara aur Charlie ki Hit list
 Angara aur Bichhua
 Angara aur Hurdang
 Angara ke 3 Dushman
 Ek do teen(1-2-3)
 Bulletproof Angara
 Angara Hawa Mahal Me
 Angara ka Khel
 Gazab Angara
 Angara ka Inteqam
 Angara aur Kala Bagh
 Angara Ka Khatra
 Chakkar Pe Chakkar
 Angara ka Double Cross
 Angara aur Commando No. 1
 Sheh aur Maat
 Angara ki Chot
 Angara ka Chakrvyuh
 Angara aur Hawa Hawai
 Angara aur Khatre ki Ghanti
 Angara Aur Kangaroo
 Ek Aur Ek 11
 Angara ka Anokha Dushman
 Angara aur Tambura
 Angara Aur Pishach
 Angara Ka Kohram
 Bhayankar Angara
 Jaljala
 Takkar
 Angara Aur Samudri Sher
 Angara Ka Sagar Manthan

Plot of the Jambu storyline 

In this storyline, Jambu gets stranded on a planet. He becomes their ruler by killing the native race's King by beating him in a duel. Later stories explored his improving relations with native race, rebuilding their society and saving them from attacks. Slowly, he discovers his doppelganger by the name of "Shanichar". He also finds out that in previous life he was tortured and killed by him and so when he was created, Shanichar's image and powers were in the sub-conscious mind of the professor whose brain he carries now.

Both of them had the final showdown with Jambu killing him with the planet's water (which has acidic properties and only the protection against it is a special element from the native planet). Instead of finishing the story arc, they continued the series by introducing "Sarkata". He finds the head who tells him that his body has liquid which can cure all diseases and grant immortality. He also tells a fake story to gain Jambu's sympathy.

The quest begins to find his whole body as the liquid can only be extracted if the whole body is brought together. After a lot of struggle he finally brings whole of his body together and brings him back to India in order to extract the Miracle Liquid called "Amrit". However, it backfires as he refuses to give anything and reveals his real name as "Sarkanda".

One of the well known comics of Jambu series is मर गया जम्बू in which two other superhero's of Tulsi comics: Angara and Tausi killed Jambu. It was a digest comics with 60 pages.

जम्बू के बेटे was the next comics after मर गया जम्बू, in which two sons of jambu takes the revenge of Jambu's death.

References

Indian comics
Comic book publishing companies of India